The University of Massachusetts Amherst College of Natural Sciences (CNS) is the largest school at the University of Massachusetts Amherst. The College of Natural Sciences consists of thirteen departments ranging from the physical to the life sciences and two schools, the Stockbridge School of Agriculture and the School of Earth and Sustainability. In addition, CNS hosts numerous institutes and centers promoting national and international collaboration in scientific research across disciplines.

Departments
The College of Natural Sciences at University of Massachusetts Amherst consists of thirteen departments including:
 Astronomy
 Biochemistry and Molecular Biology
 Biology
 Chemistry
 Environmental Conservation
 Food Science
 Geosciences
 Mathematics and Statistics
 Microbiology
 Physics
 Polymer Science and Engineering
 Psychological and Brain Sciences
 Veterinary and Animal Sciences

Research Centers
The College of Natural Sciences at UMass Amherst hosts a number of research centers including;
Amherst Center for Fundamental Interactions (ACFI)
Center for Applied Mathematics and Mathematical Computation
Center for Evolutionary Materials
Center for Hierarchical Manufacturing
Center for Neuroendocrine Studies
Center for Research on Families
Climate System Research Center
Fergus M. Clydesdale Center for Foods for Health and Wellness
Institute for Massachusetts Biofuel Research
Large Millimeter Telescope (LMT)
 Massachusetts Center for Autonomous Materials (Mass CAM)
Northeast Climate Science Center
 UMass Research Forests
 Water Resources Research Center

References

External links 
 College of Natural Sciences official site

University of Massachusetts Amherst schools
University subdivisions in Massachusetts